Vladimir Maslov (Владимир Анатольевич Маслов/Vladimir Anatolevich Maslov; 15 August 1941, in Leningrad – 20 July 1998) was a Soviet Russian film and theatrical director, noted for his necrorealist works with Yevgeny Yufit.

Filmography
1991	Папа, умер Дед Мороз (Papa, umer Ded Moroz) - assistant director
1995	Деревянная комната (Derevyannaya komnata) - director (with Yevgeny Yufit)
1998	Silver Heads - director (with Yevgeny Yufit)

References

Russian film directors
Mass media people from Saint Petersburg
1941 births
1998 deaths